Anthene rubrimaculata is a butterfly in the family Lycaenidae. It is found in Tanzania.

The larvae feed on the flowers of Bridelia micrantha.

Subspecies
Anthene rubrimaculata rubrimaculata (north-eastern Tanzania)
Anthene rubrimaculata tukuyu Kielland, 1990 (south-western Tanzania)
Anthene rubrimaculata zanzibarica Congdon & Collins, 1998 (Tanzania: Zanzibar)

References

Butterflies described in 1909
Anthene
Endemic fauna of Tanzania
Butterflies of Africa